Jorge Coscia (26 August 1952 – 7 October 2021) was an Argentine filmmaker and politician.

References

1952 births
2021 deaths
Argentine politicians
Members of the Argentine Chamber of Deputies elected in Buenos Aires
Justicialist Party politicians
Politicians from Buenos Aires